

NVC community M4 (Carex rostrata - Sphagnum recurvum mire) is one of the mire communities in the British National Vegetation Classification system.

It is a localised community of northern and western Britain. There are no subcommunities.

Community composition

The following constant species are found in this community:
 Bottle Sedge (Carex rostrata)
 Common Haircap (Polytrichum commune)
 Feathery Bog-moss (Sphagnum cuspidatum)
 Flat-topped / Flexuous Bog-mosses S. recurvum

Two rare species are associated with the community:
 String Sedge (Carex chordorrhiza)
 Tufted Loosestrife (Lysimachia thrysiflora)

Distribution

This community is found in Cornwall and in various locations in Wales, northern England and Scotland.

References

 Rodwell, J. S. (1991) British Plant Communities Volume 2 - Mires and heaths  (hardback),  (paperback)

M04